Psilotris is a genus of gobies native to the western Atlantic Ocean.

Species
There are currently six recognized species in this genus:
 Psilotris alepis Ginsburg, 1953 (Scaleless goby)
 Psilotris amblyrhynchus D. G. Smith & C. C. Baldwin, 1999
 Psilotris batrachodes J. E. Böhlke, 1963 (Toadfish goby)
 Psilotris boehlkei D. W. Greenfield, 1993
 Psilotris celsa J. E. Böhlke, 1963 (Highspine goby)
 Psilotris kaufmani D. W. Greenfield, Findley & R. K. Johnson, 1993

References

Gobiidae